The Samsung Jack, or Samsung SGH-i637, is a smartphone available through AT&T in the United States.  It is the successor to the Samsung BlackJack II.

The phone comes in metallic gray.

External links 
 Samsung Jack Users Manual
samsung service support
CareAce-Samsung Jack support

Samsung mobile phones
Mobile phones introduced in 2008
Mobile phones with an integrated hardware keyboard